Frederick Manning may refer to:
Frederic Manning (1882–1935), Australian poet and novelist
Frederick Norton Manning, Australian asylum superintendent
Frederick Edward Maning, New Zealand settler
For Frederick George Manning executed for murder in 1849, see Marie Manning (murderer)